Order of the Star could refer to:

Awards and distinctions
Order of the Star of Africa
Order of the Star of Ghana
Order of the Star of Jordan
Order of the Star of Italian Solidarity
Order of the Star of Karageorge
Order of the Star of Romania
Order of the Star of South Africa
Order of the African Star
Order of the Equatorial Star
Order of the Polar Star (Norway)
Order of the Red Star
Order of the White Star

Chivalric Orders
Order of the Star (Anjouan)
Order of the Star (France)
Order of the Star of India
Order of the Polar Star

Dynastic Orders
Order of the Star of Ethiopia
Order of the Star of Sarawak

Other organizations
Order of the Star in the East
Order of the Star Spangled Banner
Order of the Eastern Star

See also